

Oman
 Mombasa – Nasr ibn Abdallah al-Mazru‘i, Wali of Mombasa (1698–1728)

Portugal
 Angola – António de Albuquerque Coelho de Carvalho, Governor of Angola (1722–1725)
 Macau –
 D.Cristovao de Severim Manuel, Governor of Macau (1722–1724)
 Antonio Carneiro de Alcacova, Governor of Macau (1724–1727)

Colonial governors
Colonial governors
1724